The 31st Premio Lo Nuestro ceremony was held on February 21, 2019. Univision broadcast the show live from the AmericanAirlines Arena in Miami, Florida. Mexican-American TV presenter, Alejandra Espinoza, Mexican singer and actress Maite Perroni, and American singer Victor Manuelle hosted the ceremony.

The ceremony honors the best in Latin music in categories such as regional Mexican, tropical, and urban. Natti Natasha had the most nominations with 14, followed by J Balvin and Bad Bunny with 12 each. Voting started on January 8 and lasted until January 22, 2019. Ozuna had the most wins of the night with nine, followed by Reik and Wisin with five, and Natti Natasha with four.

The 2019 edition of Premios Lo Nuestro debuted seven new categories: Sierreño Artist of the Year, reflecting the fusion of regional Mexican sounds; Replay Song of the Year, recognizing the popularity of classic hits that fans continue listening to; Single of the Year, the launch of a single song that became a hit; Crossover Collaboration of the Year, hit song in which an Anglo artist is featured; Remix of the Year, popular song in which more than three artists are featured; Social Artist of the Year, renowned artist who shares and engages the most with fans across social media platforms; and Tour of the Year, recognizing sold-out concert tours. Brazilian singer Roberto Carlos was presented with the Excellence Award.

Performers

Presenters 

 Galilea Montijo and Diego Torres – presented Song of the Year
 Patricia Velásquez – introduced Juanes
 Amara La Negra and Gabriel Soto – presented Tropical Song of the Year
 Alex Fernandez and Lupita Infante – introduced Joss Favela, Reik, Roberto Carlos and Alejandro Sanz
 De La Ghetto, Reykon and Victoria La Mala – presented Regional Mexican Artist of the Year
 Omar Chaparro – introduced Daddy Yankee
 Anitta and Algenis Perez Soto – presented Male Urban Artist of the Year
 Primer Impacto cast – introduced Intocable
 Pepe Aguilar – presented Lifetime Achievement Award
 Abraham Mateo, Kimberly Dos Ramos and Nacho – introduced Christian Nodal
 El Bebeto, Inna and Pedro Moreno – presented Revelation Artist of the Year
 Oscar De La Rosa and Sandra Echeverría – presented Sierreño Artist of the Year
 El Bueno, la Mala y el Feo cast – introduced Piso 21
 Casper Smart, Manu Manzo and Ulices Chaidez – presented Tropical Collaboration of the Year
 El Dasa and Lele Pons – introduced Anuel AA

Winners and nominees
The official nominees were revealed on January 8, 2019. Natti Natasha had the most nominations with 14, followed by J Balvin and Bad Bunny with 12 each, Ozuna with 10, Nicky Jam with eight, and Maluma, Becky G, and Wisin all with 7. Brazilian singer Anitta nabbed four nominations, including revelation of the year. Ozuna had the most wins of the night with nine, followed by Reik and Wisin with five, Natti Natasha with four, and J Balvin with three. Daddy Yankee and Intocable were honored with the Lifetime Achievement Award, while Roberto Carlos received the Excellence Award.

General
Artist of the Year
J Balvin
Carlos Vives
Christian Nodal
Maluma

Song of the Year
Reik (featuring Ozuna and Wisin) – "Me niego"
Carlos Vives – "Hoy Tengo Tiempo (Pinta Sensual)"
Calibre 50 – "Mitad y Mitad"
Nicky Jam and J Balvin – "X"

Video of the Year
Karol G and J Balvin (featuring Nicky Jam) – "Mi Cama (Remix)"
Sofía Reyes (featuring Jason Derulo and De La Ghetto) – "1, 2, 3"
Lele Pons – "Celoso"
Maluma – "El Préstamo"
Piso 21 – "La Vida sin Ti"
Rosalía – "Malamente"
El Bebeto – "Seremos"
Residente and Dillon Francis (featuring iLe) – "Sexo"
Pablo Alborán – "Tu Refugio"
Sebastián Yatra and Mau y Ricky – "Ya No Tiene Novio"

Single of the Year
Reik (featuring Ozuna and Wisin) – "Me niego"
Natti Natasha – "Quién Sabe"
Calibre 50 – "Mitad y Mitad"
Nicky Jam and J Balvin – "X"

Remix of the Year
Nio Garcia, Casper Magico and Bad Bunny (featuring Ozuna, Nicky Jam and Darell) – "Te Boté (Remix)"
Daddy Yankee (featuring Becky G, Bad Bunny and Natti Natasha) – "Dura (Remix)"
Enrique Iglesias (featuring Bad Bunny and Natti Natasha) – "El Baño (Remix)"
Farruko, Daddy Yankee and Akon (featuring Sean Paul) – "Inolvidable (Remix)"
Mau y Ricky and Karol G (featuring Becky G, Leslie Grace and Lali) – "Mi Mala (Remix)"

Collaboration of the Year
Reik (featuring Ozuna and Wisin) – "Me niego"
Julión Álvarez and Hansen Flores – "Fino pero Sordo"
Silvestre Dangond and Natti Natasha – "Justicia"
Nicky Jam and J Balvin – "X"

Crossover Collaboration of the Year
DJ Snake (featuring Cardi B, Ozuna and Selena Gomez – "Taki Taki"
Luis Fonsi and Stefflon Don – "Calypso"
Marc Anthony, Bad Bunny and Will Smith – "Esta Rico"
Cardi B, Bad Bunny and J Balvin – "I Like It"
Bad Bunny (featuring Drake) – "Mia"

Tour of the Year
Ozuna – Aura Tour
Shakira – El Dorado World Tour
Maluma – F.A.M.E. Tour
Romeo Santos – Golden Tour
Bad Bunny – La Nueva Religión Tour
Marc Anthony – Legacy Tour
Luis Miguel – México Por Siempre Tour
Alejandro Fernández and Los Tigres del Norte – Rompiendo Fronteras Tour
Gloria Trevi and Alejandra Guzmán – Versus World Tour
J Balvin – Vibras Tour

Replay Song of the Year
Enrique Iglesias – "Por Amarte"
Laura Pausini – "Amores Extraños"
Maná – "Cachito"
Paulina Rubio – "El Último Adiós"
Alejandra Guzmán – "Volverte a Amar"

Social Artist of the Year
J Balvin
Anitta
CNCO
Jennifer Lopez
Maluma

Revelation Artist of the Year
Anuel AA
Anitta
Casper Magico
Hansen Flores
Manuel Turizo
Nio Garcia
Raymix
TINI
T3r Elemento
Virlan Garcia

Regional Mexican

Regional Mexican Artist of the Year
Christian Nodal
Gerardo Ortiz
Joss Favela
Luis Coronel
Raymix

Regional Mexican Song of the Year
Banda MS – "Tu Postura"
Calibre 50 – "Mitad y Mitad"
Raymix – "Oye Mujer"
Banda Rancho Viejo – "Privilegio"
Ulices Chaidez – "Que Bonito Es Querer"

Regional Mexican Group or Duo of the Year
Calibre 50
Banda Carnaval
Banda Rancho Viejo
Banda MS
Ulices Chaidez y Sus Plebes

Banda Song of the Year
Banda MS – "Tu Postura"
La Arrolladora Banda el Limon de Rene Camacho – "Calidad y Cantidad"
La Adictiva Banda San Jose de Mesillas – "En Peligro de Extinción"
Banda Rancho Viejo – "Privilegio"
Banda Carnaval – "Segunda Opción"

Sierreño Artist of the Year
T3R Elemento
Crecer German
Lenin Ramirez
Ulices Chaidez y Sus Plebes
Virlan Garcia

Norteño Song of the Year
Calibre 50 – "Mitad y Mitad"
Voz De Mando – "El que a ti te gusta"
Intocable – "Cuidaré"
Gerardo Ortiz – "El aroma de tu piel"
Julión Álvarez and Hansen Flores – "Fino pero Sordo"

Urban

Male Urban Artist of the Year
Ozuna
Bad Bunny
Daddy Yankee
J Balvin
Nicky Jam

Female Urban Artist of the Year
Karol G
Anitta
Becky G
Cardi B
Natti Natasha

Urban Song of the Year
Becky G and Natti Natasha – "Sin Pijama"
Daddy Yankee (featuring Becky G, Bad Bunny and Natti Natasha) – "Dura (Remix)"
Enrique Iglesias (featuring Bad Bunny and Natti Natasha) – "El Baño (Remix)"
Ozuna – "Unica"
Nicky Jam and J Balvin – "X"

Urban Collaboration of the Year
Becky G and Natti Natasha – "Sin Pijama"
Enrique Iglesias (featuring Bad Bunny and Natti Natasha) – "El Baño (Remix)"
J Balvin, Anitta and Jeon – "Machika"
Ozuna – "Unica"
Nicky Jam and J Balvin – "X"

Tropical
Tropical Artist of the Year
Carlos Vives
Jerry Rivera
Juan Luis Guerra
Silvestre Dangond
Victor Manuelle

Tropical Song of the Year
Natti Natasha– "Quién Sabe"
Carlos Vives – "Hoy Tengo Tiempo (Pinta Sensual)"
Silvestre Dangond and Natti Natasha – "Justicia"
Jerry Rivera and Yandel – "Mira"
Victor Manuelle (featuring Juan Luis Guerra) – "Quiero Tiempo"

Tropical Collaboration of the Year
Silvestre Dangond and Natti Natasha – "Justicia"
Jerry Rivera and Yandel – "Mira"
Victor Manuelle (featuring Juan Luis Guerra) – "Quiero Tiempo"
Diego Torres and Carlos Vives – "Un Poquito"

Pop/Rock

Pop/Rock Group or Duo of the Year
CNCO
Mau y Ricky
Piso 21
Reik

Pop/Rock Artist of the Year
Maluma
Juanes
Ricky Martin
Shakira
Thalía

Pop/Rock Song of the Year
Reik (featuring Ozuna and Wisin) – "Me niego"
Maluma – "El Préstamo"
Ricky Martin (featuring Wisin and Yandel) – "Fiebre"
Piso 21 – "La Vida sin Ti"
Nacho – "No Te Vas"

Pop/Rock Collaboration of the Year
Reik (featuring Ozuna and Wisin) – "Me niego"
Shakira and Maluma – "Clandestino"
Ricky Martin (featuring Wisin and Yandel) – "Fiebre"
Thalía and Natti Natasha – "No me acuerdo"
Descemer Bueno and Enrique Iglesias (featuring El Micha) – "Nos Fuimos Lejos"

Special Merit Awards

Lifetime Achievement Award
Daddy Yankee
Intocable

Excellence Award
Roberto Carlos

Multiple nominations and awards
The following received multiple nominations:

Fourteen:
Natti Natasha
Twelve:
Bad Bunny
J Balvin
Eleven:
Ozuna
Eight:
Nicky Jam
Seven:
Maluma
Wisin
Six:
Becky G
Reik

Five:
Calibre 50
Daddy Yankee
Enrique Iglesias
Yandel
Four:
Anitta
Carlos Vives
Silvestre Dangond
Three:
Banda MS
Banda Rancho Viejo
Cardi B
Hansen Flores
Jerry Rivera
Karol G
Mau y Ricky
Piso 21
Raymix
Ricky Martin
Shakira
Victor Manuelle

Two:
Alejandra Guzmán
Banda Carnaval
Cásper Mágico
Christian Nodal
CNCO
Gerardo Ortiz
Juan Luis Guerra
Julión Álvarez
Marc Anthony
Nio García
T3R Elemento
Thalía
Ulices Chaidez y Sus Plebes
Virlan García

The following received multiple awards:

Nine:
Ozuna
Five:
Reik
Wisin

Four:
Natti Natasha
Three:
J Balvin

Two:
Becky G
Calibre 50
Karol G
Nicky Jam

References

2019 music awards
2019 awards in the United States
Lo Nuestro Awards by year
2019 in Latin music